Lyman Spitzer Jr. (June 26, 1914 – March 31, 1997) was an American theoretical physicist, astronomer and mountaineer. As a scientist, he carried out research into star formation, plasma physics, and in 1946, conceived the idea of telescopes operating in outer space. Spitzer invented the stellarator plasma device and is the namesake of NASA's Spitzer Space Telescope. As a mountaineer, he made the first ascent of Mount Thor, with Donald C. Morton.

Early life and education
Spitzer was born to a Presbyterian family in Toledo, Ohio, the son of Lyman Spitzer Sr. and Blanche Carey (née Brumback). Through his paternal grandmother, he was related to inventor Eli Whitney. Spitzer graduated from Scott High School.  He then attended Phillips Academy in 1929 and went on to Yale College, where he graduated Phi Beta Kappa in 1935 and was a member of Skull and Bones.  During a year of study at Cambridge University, he was influenced by Arthur Eddington and the young Subrahmanyan Chandrasekhar.  Returning to the U.S., Spitzer received his Ph.D. in physics from Princeton University in 1938 after completing a doctoral dissertation, titled "The spectra of late supergiant stars", under the direction of Henry Norris Russell.

Mountaineering
In 1965, Spitzer and Donald Morton became the first to climb Mount Thor , located in Auyuittuq National Park, on Baffin Island, Nunavut, Canada. As a member of the American Alpine Club, Spitzer established the "Lyman Spitzer Cutting Edge Climbing Award" (Now called the "Cutting Edge Grant") which gives $12,000 to several mountain climbing expeditions annually.

Science
Spitzer's brief time as a faculty member at Yale was interrupted by his wartime work on the development of sonar.  In 1947, at the age of 33, he succeeded Russell as director of Princeton University Observatory, an institution that, virtually jointly with his contemporary and friend Martin Schwarzschild, he continued to head until 1979.

Spitzer's research centered on the interstellar medium, to which he brought a deep understanding of plasma physics.  In the 1930s and 1940s, he was among the first to recognize star formation as an ongoing contemporary process.  His monographs, "Diffuse Matter in Space" (1968) and "Physical Processes in the Interstellar Medium" (1978) consolidated decades of work, and themselves became the standard texts for some decades more.

Spitzer was the founding director of Project Matterhorn, Princeton University's pioneering program in controlled thermonuclear research, renamed in 1961 as Princeton Plasma Physics Laboratory.  He was an early proponent of space optical astronomy in general, and in particular of the project that became Hubble Space Telescope.

In 1981, Spitzer became a founding member of the World Cultural Council.

Death
Spitzer died suddenly on March 31, 1997, after completing a regular day of work at Princeton University. He was buried at Princeton Cemetery and was survived by wife Doreen Canaday Spitzer, four children, and ten grandchildren. Among Spitzer's four children is neurobiologist Nicholas C. Spitzer, who is currently the professor and vice chair in neurobiology at UC San Diego.

Honors
Awards
 Fellow of the American Physical Society (1941) 
 Member of the United States National Academy of Sciences (1952)
 Fellow of the American Academy of Arts and Sciences (1953)
 Henry Norris Russell Lectureship (1953)
 Member of the American Philosophical Society (1959)
 Bruce Medal (1973)
 Henry Draper Medal of the National Academy of Sciences (1974)
 James Clerk Maxwell Prize for Plasma Physics (1975)
 Gold Medal of the Royal Astronomical Society (1978)
 National Medal of Science (1979)
 Franklin Medal (1980)
 Prix Jules Janssen of the Société astronomique de France (French Astronomical Society) (1980)
 Crafoord Prize (1985)

Named after him
 Asteroid 2160 Spitzer
 Spitzer Space Telescope
 Lyman Spitzer Library in Davenport College, Yale University
Lyman Spitzer Building at the Princeton Plasma Physics Laboratory in Princeton, NJ
 Lyman Spitzer Planetarium at the Fairbanks Museum and Planetarium in St. Johnsbury, VT
 Answer to the final question on NTN Buzztime's Showdown on September 16, 2008.
 Spitzer Building in Toledo, Ohio.
 Landau-Spitzer Award (American Physical Society)

References

External links
NASA biography
Papers by Lyman Spitzer at the Princeton University Library
Oral history interview transcript with Lyman Spitzer on 8 April 1977, American Institute of Physics, Niels Bohr Library and Archives
 Oral History interview transcript with Lyman Spitzer on 15 March 1978, American Institute of Physics, Niels Bohr Library and Archives
 Oral history interview transcript with Lyman Spitzer on 10 May 1978, American Institute of Physics, Niels Bohr Library and Archives
 Oral History interview transcript with Lyman Spitzer on 27 November 1991, American Institute of Physics, Niels Bohr Library and Archives
 Biographical Memoirs, National Academy of Sciences

1914 births
1997 deaths
American people of German descent
American astronomers
Phillips Academy alumni
Princeton University alumni
Princeton University faculty
National Medal of Science laureates
Burials at Princeton Cemetery
Recipients of the Gold Medal of the Royal Astronomical Society
Foreign Members of the Royal Society
Fellows of the American Academy of Arts and Sciences
Yale College alumni
Yale University faculty
Founding members of the World Cultural Council
American plasma physicists
Fellows of the American Physical Society
Princeton Plasma Physics Laboratory people
Spitzer Space Telescope
Members of the American Philosophical Society